Cariel Brooks (born April 24, 1991) is a Canadian football cornerback for the Hamilton Tiger-Cats of the Canadian Football League (CFL). He played college football at Adams State. He was signed as an undrafted free agent by the Arizona Cardinals of the National Football League (NFL).

High school career
Brooks attended Miami Carol City High School. While there he was a second-team All-conference selection in football. He was also an All-conference selection in track & field.

College career
Brooks then attended Pasadena City College in 2011 before transferring to Adams State University. As a sophomore in 2012, he appeared in eight games. He recorded 21 tackles (15 solo), one tackle-for-loss, two interceptions and seven passes defensed. In 2013, as a junior, he appeared in 11 games. He recorded 38 tackles and three interceptions. As a senior in 2014, he appeared in 10 games and recorded three interceptions.

Professional career

Arizona Cardinals
After going unselected in the 2015 NFL Draft Brooks was signed by the Arizona Cardinals. He was released on September 5 and two days later he was signed to the Cardinals' practice squad. On October 14, 2015, he was promoted to the Cardinals' active roster. He appeared in three games for the Cardinals, recording one special teams tackle. On November 11, he was placed on injured reserve with an ankle injury. He was released from injured reserve on December 29. He signed a futures contract on January 27, 2016. On September 3, 2016, he was released by the Cardinals.

Toronto Argonauts
Brooks signed with the Toronto Argonauts on March 14, 2017. He was released by the Argonauts on June 18, 2017.

Hamilton Tiger-Cats
Brooks was signed to the Hamilton Tiger-Cats' practice roster on August 8, 2017. He was promoted to the active roster on August 13, and was demoted to the practice squad on August 17, 2017. He re-signed with the Tiger-Cats on January 25, 2021.

References

External links

 Adams State Grizzlies bio
 Arizona Cardinals bio

1991 births
Living people
People from Miami Gardens, Florida
American football cornerbacks
Canadian football defensive backs
American players of Canadian football
Pasadena City College alumni
Adams State Grizzlies football players
Arizona Cardinals players
Toronto Argonauts players
Hamilton Tiger-Cats players